El Zulia is a municipality of the Norte de Santander Department in Colombia. A portion of this municipality is part of the Metropolitan Area of Cúcuta.

References
 Government of Norte de Santander - El Zulia

Cúcuta
Municipalities of the Norte de Santander Department